Natalya Koneva (born 2 June 1989) is a Uzbekistani female basketball player. She plays as a forward for the Uzbekistan team. She represented Uzbekistan at the 2017 FIBA Women's Asia Cup and was also the part of the Uzbekistani 3x3 basketball team which claimed a silver medal at the 2017 Asian Indoor and Martial Arts Games held in Turkmenistan.

References 

1989 births
Living people
Uzbekistani women's basketball players
Forwards (basketball)
21st-century Uzbekistani women